Çalışkan is a Turkish word meaning hard working. It may refer to:

People
Hamza Çalışkan (born 1994), Turkish Paralympian para table tennis player
Nizamettin Çalışkan (born 1987), Turkish footballer
Oğuz Çalışkan (born 1988), Turkish footballer
Rıfat Çalışkan (born 1940), Turkish Olympian cyclist
Sema Çalışkan, female boxer
Semih Çalışkan (born 1986), Turkish writer
Tuncay Çalışkan (born 1977), Turkish-born Austrian taekwondo practitioner

Places
Çalışkan, Gercüş, a village in Gercüş district of Batman Province, Turkey
Çalışkan, Karayazı

REDIRECT Caliskan